Trom agus Éadrom (meaning "Heavy and Light") was an Irish television variety show which was broadcast bilingually in Irish and English by Raidió Teilifís Éireann between 1975 and 1985. The show was presented by Liam Ó Murchú and was one of the more popular shows on Irish television. Ó Murchú became a household name and was famous for his catchphrase "bualadh bos".

References

1975 Irish television series debuts
1985 Irish television series endings
1970s Irish television series
1980s Irish television series
Irish-language television shows
Irish variety television shows
RTÉ original programming